Alik Haýdarow (born 27 April 1981) is a Turkmenistan footballer who plays as a defender for Altyn Asyr FK in the Ýokary Liga. He previously played for Ýokary liga club FC Ashgabat.

He is a member of the Turkmenistan national football team.

Club career
Won the gold medal in the 2014 Ýokary Liga with Altyn Asyr FK. In 2015 moved to FC Ashgabat.

Club career stats
Last update: 15 March 2008

References

External links

1981 births
Living people
Turkmenistan footballers
Turkmenistan international footballers
FC Taraz players
Expatriate footballers in Kazakhstan
Turkmenistan expatriate sportspeople in Kazakhstan
FC Aşgabat players
Footballers at the 2002 Asian Games
Association football defenders
Asian Games competitors for Turkmenistan